Kristian Bøgsted (born 1982) is a Danish politician and a member of the Folketing for the Denmark Democrats party. He has represented North Jutland since 2022.

Biography
Bøgsted was born in Skive in 1983 and is the son of politician and former member of the Folketing Bent Bøgsted. He grew up in Ringkøbing-Skjern municipality. Bøgsted trained as a waiter during college and then worked as a manager for Vestas.

He was elected to the city council of Ringkøbing-Skjern as a member of the Danish People's Party (DPP) and became chairman of the party on the municipal council but lost his seat in the 2021 Danish local elections. He subsequently quit the DPP citing working conditions within the party and Morten Messerschmidt's leadership. He later joined the Denmark Democrats and during the 2022 Danish general election was elected to the Folketing for the party.

Bøgsted lives in No, Denmark and is married with five children.

References 

Living people
1982 births
Danish People's Party politicians
Danish municipal councillors
Denmark Democrats politicians
Members of the Folketing 2022–2026